Whitestown Town Hall, also known as Liberty Hall, is a historic town hall building located at Whitesboro in Oneida County, New York. It was built in 1807 and is a two-story brick structure situated on the village green.  It features 4 two-story pilasters which are terminated at the top by a simple wood cornice.

It was listed on the National Register of Historic Places in 1973.

It currently serves as the village courthouse, while offices for the Town of Whitestown are housed in newer buildings outside of Whitesboro.

References

External links

City and town halls on the National Register of Historic Places in New York (state)
Historic American Buildings Survey in New York (state)
Government buildings completed in 1807
Buildings and structures in Oneida County, New York
National Register of Historic Places in Oneida County, New York